Hana no Furu Gogo (Japanese: 花の降る午後, Afternoon When Flowers Fell) is a 1988 Japanese novel by Teru Miyamoto published by Kadokawa Shoten.

A TV drama adaption was made in 1989 that was directed by Hiroyuki Eguchi and starred Shima Iwashita, Hideaki Nitani, and Toshiyuki Nagashima. A film was made in the same year, releasing on October 7, and stars Yūko Kotegawa, Masahiro Takashima, and Junko Sakurada.

Plot 
After the death of her husband, Yoshinao, in 1981, Noriko Kai has been managing the French restaurant Avignon in Kobe left by Yoshinao for four years. One day, Masamichi Takami, a young painter, visited the recreant and offered to give a painting called White House to Noriko, as well as to hold his own exhibition. However, a letter from Yoshinao was found on the back of this painting and revealed to Noriko that he had a hidden child. Around that time, waiters Shuichi Akitsu, Toshihiro Mizuno, and manager Naoe Hayama quit their jobs at Avignon over a scandal that happened. When Noriko consulting with her acquaintance, Doctor Wong Kin Ming, she finds out that Yukio and Misa Araki, a gambling and diamond smuggling couple, were trying to take over Avignon Noriko asks Yoshinao's best friend Kenichi Kudo, a private detective, to investigate the Araki couple, but the driver Koshiba and chef Katsuro Kaga were attacked and injured. Avignon was forced to close temporarily, but with the encouragement of Takami and the efforts of Kaga, reopened soon after. However, Misa plans to take Jill, the daughter of her neighbor Reed Brown, as a hostage to try to take the land, but Noriko sneaks into the Araki couple's cruiser party and rescues Jill. Misa then tries to reach out to Mika, Yoshinao's secret child, but Noriko confronts Misa convinces her to not go with the plan, saying that she knew her sadness. After, Mika suddenly visits Avignon, and Noriko warmly welcomes and watches over her.

Publication history 
The novel was serialized from 1985 to 1986 in local newspapers like the Minami Nihon Shinbunsha, Niigata Nippo, Tokushima Shimbun, and Kita Nippon Shinbun. It was then picked up by Kadokawa Shoten in 1988 and by Kondansha Bunko in 1995.

It was included in Shinchosha's Teru Miyamoto Complete Works Vol. 8.

Characters

Main 
Noriko Kai (甲斐典子, Kai Noriko)
The 37-year-old protagonist of the story. She succeeded his late husband at the age of 33 and runs Avignon, a French restaurant in Kobe. She meets Masamichi while looking at the painting "White House" that her husband bought for her, with Masamichi asking for the painting of No. 60 for herself. Noriko starts to be attracted to Masamichi, but is afraid of the age difference between them.
Masamichi Takami (高見雅道, Takami Masamichi)
A young 27-year-old painter who painted the landscape painting White House. He visits Avignon to lend the White House for a solo exhibition. Thinking that the painting isn't good, he doesn't have the confidence to pursue painting. His usual occupation is illustrator and works as a salesman at a design studio, pasting phototypesetting characters.

Kai family 
Yoshinao (義直, Yoshinao)
Noriko's husband who died of cancer at the age of 35. He was the captain of the rugby club in college. On May 2, 1981, five days before Yoshinao died, he left a letter addressed to Noriko on the back of the forehead of the "White House." The letter contained a story of the past hidden from Noriko.
Ritsu Kai (甲斐リツ, Kai Ritsu)
Yoshinao's mother and Noriko's mother-in-law.
Kayoko (加世子, Kayoko)
Ritsu's distant daughter. She enrolled in a private women's college and stayed at the Kai family. She is hostile towards Noriko.

Avignon related 
Katsuro Kaga (加賀勝郎, Kaga Katsurō)
A chef who has trained in France for twelve years and has been featured in various gravure and specialized magazines. He makes homemade aperitifs and serves it to customers, but I keeps his identity a secret. He has a wide range of hobbies, such as painting, ceramics exhibitions, and reading books.
Naoe Hayama (葉山直衛, Hayama Naoe)
A man who is honest and familiar with accounting.
Toshihiro Mizuno (水野敏弘, Mizuno Toshihiro)
A 37-year-old Avignon clerk who likes Noriko. He is more familiar with French cuisine than Noriko as he has worked at nearly four French restaurants in Tokyo.
Shuichi Akitsu (秋津修一, Akitsu Shūichi)
An Avignon waiter and Hayama's nephew. He came to Matsuki's shop to ask about the relationship between Mizuno and Kazuko. Because of this, Noriko handed him a dismissal.
Kyoya Emi (江見恭弥, Emi Kyōya)
An Avignon clerk. They traveled to France for the future of the store.
Koshiba (小柴, Koshiba)
A man with dark career in the past who tells lies in his resume, with Noriko finding out but not telling anyone.
Katsuhiko Kajiki (梶木克彦, Kajiki Katsuhiko)
A clerk who works for Avignon with the introduction of Mizuno and Emi.

Customer related 
Kazuko Matsuki (松木かづ子, Matsuki Kazuko)
The wife of the precious metal shop owner Seibei. She is the one who created the JTB Association in their 40s (Jazz Dance J, Eating T, Book B). Noriko stopped coming to Avignon and went to Ashiya's Matsuki's house because Noriko made a mistake from the initial "D" of the dance to "Fat no Kai" because the members of the group did not succeed in preventing obesity by jazz dance. Is apologizing. On the other hand, he gives an exorbitant tip to Avignon's clerk Mizuno.
Seibei Matsuki (松木精兵衛, Matsuki Seibei)
The 66-year-old husband of Kazuko, the president of a precious metal store and a customer of Avignon. Matsuki wants to buy the land of Reed Brown's shop, even using the general manager of the general affairs department, Eikichi Gotō.
Misa Araki (荒木実紗, Araki Misa)
The senior Managing Director of Araki Enterprise and the son of Seibei. I was recently investigating my relatives.
Yukio Araki (荒木幸夫, Araki Yukio)
Misa's husband who is shown to be able to handle the Yakuza.

Other 
Reed Brown (リード・ブラウン, Rīdo Buraun)
A 78 year old Englishman who has pulmonary emphysema who plays rugby. He meets Noriko as an opponent at a chess game and loses to Noriko in the first match.
Wong Kinmei (黄健明, Kō Ken Mei)
A man with gout on his right foot from relapse.
Huango Ume (黄芳梅, Kō Hō Ume)
The 39-year-old daughter of Kenmei.
Huang Yasujin (黄康順, Kō Kō Jun)
The 42-year-old son of Kenmei, who has a crush on Noriko.

Adaptations and appearances

TV drama adaptation 
In 1989, a TV drama adaption was made of the book and aired on NHK General TV. The drama starred Shima Iwashita, Hideaki Nitani, and Toshiyuki Nagashima, with the show being written by Hata Mineaki and directed by Hiroyuki Eguchi. The song "Hitori Botchi no Dimanshe (Nichiyōbi)" by Yasuko Ōki was used as its theme song.

The show was a part of the first phase of "Drama 10" on NHK General TV along with Yoru no Nagai Sakebi and Tanin no Kankei.

Movie adaptation 

In 1989, the novel was also adapted into a film. It starred Yūko Kotegawa, Masahiro Takashima, Junko Sakurada, and went on to gross 300 million yen. Kotegawa was nominated for the 13th Japan Academy Award for Best Actress, with Sakurada being nominated for the Best Supporting Actress Award.

References 

1988 Japanese novels
Japanese novels adapted into films
Japanese novels adapted into television shows